The Bolivian Army is the land force branch of the Armed Forces of Bolivia.
Figures on the size and composition of the Bolivian army vary considerably, with little official data available. It is estimated that the army has between 26,000 to 60,000  men.

Organization

Combat units directly under the Army general command 
 1st Infantry Regiment Colorados (Presidential Guard), contains two 2 battalions: BI-201 and BI-202
 BATCOM-251,
 Gen. maintenance cen. no. 1
 Transport batt. no. 1.
 1st National parks Security Regiment

Special forces command 
The Special Forces command controls the following units:

 1st Ranger Regt. German Busch,  Challapata
 12th Ranger Regt. "MANCHEGO", Montero 
 16th Infantry Regt. JORDAN, Riberalta (Special Forces)
 18th Parachute Infantry Regiment VICTORIA "Army Special Troops Training Center", Cochabamba 
 24th Ranger Regiment (Mountain) MÉNDEZ ARCOS, Challapata

Army aviation command 
Army aviation company 291 (La Paz), army aviation company 292 (Santa Cruz)
291st Cavalry Group (La Paz)

Regional
The Bolivian Army has six military regions (regiones militares—RMs) covering the various Departments of Bolivia:

 RM 1, La Paz, most of La Paz Department: 1st Army Division, 1st Mechanized Division, 297th MPB C.L.Saavedra (Military Police battalion), 296th En Btn  CNL R.C.Zabalegui (ecological batt.), BE-297 (ecolog. batt.), BATLOG-1 (Logistics btn.), 291st Air Group, 1st Military Hospital, Military Police School, Army Equestrian Center, Military College of Bolivia "COL Gustavo Villaroel Lopez", Army School of Intelligence, Army Engineers School MCAL Antonio Jose de Sucre, Army Signals and Communications School, Army Armor School, Army 1st Engineering Regiment CPN Felipe Ochoa "Army Engineering and Maintenance Center", Bolivian Army Military School of Music "LTCOL Antonio Patino"
 RM 2, Potosí, covering the departments of Oruro and Potosí: 2nd and 10th ADs,1st RR, 24th RR M.Arcos (ranger regt.), ADA-202 (a.a. group), Army Mountain School
 RM 3, Tarija, consisting of Tarija Department and eastern Chuquisaca and southern Santa Cruz:3rd and 4th AD
 RM 4, Sucre, covering the departments of Cochabamba and northern Chuquisaca: 7th Army Division, 272nd MP Btn., BATLOG-2 (long.Batt), mili.hospital no2, Army Arsensals Cochabamba, Army Command and Staff College MSHL Antonio de Santa Cruz, Army NCO School "SGT M. Paredez", Army Artillery School, 18th PIR "Victoria" (Army Special Troops Training Center), Army NCOs and Warrant Officers Advance Studies Institute, Army Arms Applications School, 1LT Edmundo Andrade Military High School
 RM 5, Cobija, encompassing the Pando Department and parts of La Paz and Beni departments: 6th AD, 16th IR Jordan (special forces), Army Jungle Operations School 
 RM 6,  Santa Cruz, covering most of Santa Cruz Department: 5th and 8th ADs, 273rd MPB R.Amezaga (Military Police), BE-298 (ecological batt.), 12th RR Manchego (ranger), BATLOG-3 (logist. batt.), 292 army aviation company, Bolivian Condores school (special forces), 6th IR

Army Divisions
The army is organized into ten territorial divisions, titled Army Divisions (AD), plus a mechanized division, each of which, with the exception of Viacha, occupy a region generally corresponding to the administrative departments, with some overlapping. These and their respective divisional headquarters and constituent units are:
 1st Mechanized Division Viacha (La Paz Department): 1st Field Artillery Regiment "Camacho", 6th Air Defense Artillery Regiment, 23rd IR (Mechanized Infantry Training), 4th IR Tarapaca (Mech.) 5th ACR, 2nd ACR (Training), 1st Armor Regiment, 8th IR (Mech) "Ayacucho", 2nd Artillery Regt., 6th ADA Regt.
 1st AD, Viacha (La Paz Department): 36th IR, 35th IR, 30th IR Murillo (mountain),  2nd CEB G.F.Roman.
 2nd AD (Mountain), Oruro: 21st IR Illimani (Mountain), RI 22 Mejillones, 25th RI (Mountain Training) Tocopilla, RC 8 Braun, Bat.Ing. 7 Sajama.
 3rd AD, Villamontes (Tarija Department): 5th IR Campero, RI 20 Padilla, RC 3 Aroma, RA 3 Pisagua, 1st CEB Chorolque.
 4th AD, Camiri (Santa Cruz Department):, 6th Infantry Regiment Campos, RI 11 Boqueron, 1st Cavalry Regt. "E. Avaroa", FAR 4 Bullian
 5th AD, Roboré (Santa Cruz Department): RI 13 Montes, RI 14 Florida, RI 15 Junin, RC 6 Castrillo, RA 5 Vergara
 6th AD, Trinidad: RI 17 Indepedencia, RI 29 Echevarria, RI 31 Rios, RI 32 Murguia, 2nd Cavalry Regt. Ballivan, 8th AR Mendez (reserve), Bat.Ing. 6 Riosinho.
 7th Army Division, Cochabamba (the largest):, 18th Parachute Infantry Regiment "Victoria" (Army Special Troops Training Center), 26th IR R.Barrientos (mech.) 29th PIR "CPT V.Ustariz" (airborne), 7th FA Regt. Tumusia, Bat.Ing.5 T.N.Ovando, 3rd Mil. Police Regt.
 8th AD, Santa Cruz: RI 7 Marzana, RI 10 Warnes (mech.), RC 10 G.M.J.M. Mercado, RA 9 Mitre (reserve), Bat.Ing. 3 Pando.
 9th AD (Reserve), Rurrenabaque: the Division has been reduced to reserve status and its component units have been divided up between DE-1 and DE-6
 10th AD, Tupiz: 2nd Infantry Regiment "Marshal Antonio Jose de Sucre", 3rd IR "Juan Jose Perez", RI 4 Loa, RI 27 Antofagasta, 7th ACR Chichas (Armored Cavalry), RA 12 Ayohuma (reserve)

Regimental abbreviations

RIE/IR/PIR: infantry regiment

RC/ACR: cavalry regiment

RA: artillery regiment

Bat.Ing./CEB: Engineer battalion

The ten divisions control the following units:

 eight cavalry regiments, included two mechanized regiments
 twenty-three infantry regiments included two airborne and two mountain
 one recce. mechanized regiments and one armored regiment
 two ranger regiments and one special forces regiment
 six artillery regiments and plus three in reserve
 one artillery and anti-air group
 one artillery and anti-air Regiment
 three military police battalions
 three ecological battalions
 two army aviation companies
 six engineer battalions
 Plus logistical and instructional support commands
 Presidential Guard (Bolivian Colorados Regiment) infantry regiment under direct control of the army headquarters in La Paz's Miraflores district

The Army maintains a small fleet of utility aircraft, primarily to support headquarters.

Equipment

Vehicles

Aircraft

Uniforms

Army officers, NCOs, and enlisted personnel generally wear gray service uniforms. In tropical areas they wear gray-green service uniforms. Army fatigue uniforms are olive green, and combat uniforms consist of US woodland pattern camouflage and desert pattern camouflage. The standard headgear for enlisted personnel is a beret bearing the national colors of red, yellow, and green. Armored troops and paratroopers are distinguished by black berets. Special forces wear distinctive camouflage uniforms with green berets.

See also
List of wars involving Bolivia

References

External links
 Official site (Spanish)
 Bolivian Army Adopts Cuba's Revolutionary Slogan by BBC News

Military of Bolivia